Thomson Bonar (* 1738 or 1739, † 25 July 1814) was a wine-merchant who married Elizabeth, the daughter of the engraver Andrew Bell, who co-founded the Encyclopædia Britannica with Colin Macfarquhar.

Bonar sold the 3rd through 5th editions of the Britannica, and produced the supplement to the 3rd edition Bonar held the copyright for that supplement, for whose material he asked great sums (20,000 pounds sterling) in subsequent editions, although he was granted but little (100–200 pounds). Bonar was friendly to the article authors, and introduced the policy of paying them as well as the article reviewers, and of allowing them to retain copyright for separate publication of their work.

Bonar quarreled with his father-in-law, Andrew Bell, and the two men did not speak from 1799 to 1809, when Bell died.  Bell's successor, Archibald Constable, wisely bought out Bonar's copyright for the 5th edition and kept him as an ally of the Britannica.

Thomson died on 25 July 1814, aged 75. He is buried in the northern section of St Cuthberts Churchyard in Edinburgh. The stone backs onto the access path from Princes Street. His grandson of the same name (1799–1861) is buried with him.

References

Encyclopædia Britannica
Scottish businesspeople
Year of birth missing
Place of birth missing
18th-century Scottish people
19th-century Scottish people
1814 deaths